Kurukshetra University, Kurukshetra (KUK) is a university established on 11January 1956 in Kurukshetra, in the Indian state of Haryana,  from the capital, Delhi. It is a member of Association of Commonwealth Universities.

History

The university was in 1956 as a unitary residential University. The Department of Sanskrit was the first and the only department in the university when it was inaugurated by Bharat Ratna Dr. Rajendra Prasad, the first President of the Indian Republic. The idea of establishing university was conceived by then governor of Punjab, Chandeshwar Prasad Narayan Singh, a Sanskrit scholar.

In 2012, the Department of philosophy introduced an academic course on Gita.

Campus 

Academics

Grading
The university follows a weighted average pattern to calculate grades, with the 1st and 2nd semester contributing 20% to the aggregate marks and each further semester, up to the 8th, contributing 10%.

Rankings

The university was ranked 99 among universities in India by the NIRF  in 2020. It was ranked at 68th position according to education world ranking 2020.

Faculties 

Faculty of Arts & Languages
Faculty of Social Sciences
Faculty of Life Sciences
Faculty of Science
Faculty of Education
Faculty of Indic Studies
Faculty of Engg. & Technology
Faculty of Law
Faculty of Commerce & Management

Institution

Centre of excellence (CoE) 

 Centre of excellence for research on Saraswati river:  Geoscientific research on palaeochannels & drainage basin
 Centre for advance research in earthquake studies:  Seismic hazard map and 24x7 seismic monitoring of Haryana
 Centre for applied biology in environment sciences:  Research on climate change and pollution
 Centre for information technology and automation:  Research on big data and business analytics
 Centre for advanced material research:  Ion beam centre to research on functional molecules, optical materials and nanostructures

Colleges and schools

The university has these colleges, schools and institutes:

 University Senior Secondary Model School
 Institute of Integrated and Honours Studies (Formerly University College)
 University College of Education
 Institute of Environmental studies
 Department of Law
 Department of Geophysics
 University School of Management
 University Institute of Engineering and Technology
 Institute of Management Studies
 Institute of Mass Communication & Media Technology

Affiliated colleges 

The university has 457 affiliated colleges and institutes. Notable examples include:

 E-Max School of Engineering and Applied Research
 Government Engineering College, Nilokheri
 Jind Institute of Engineering and Technology
 Karnal Institute of Technology and Management, Karnal
 Shri Krishan Institute Of Engineering & Technology
 JMIT

Achievements

Academic 

The Department of Electronic Science in 2011, was awarded a  project on nanoscience by Department of Science and Technology (DST), Government of India.

Sports 

Kurukshetra University, Kurukshetra has a number of achievements in sports. In 2015 the Boxing Team of Kurukshetra University won the All India Inter-University Boxing Championship among more than 100 Universities from all over India. All India Inter-University Boxing Championship was held at LPU, Jalandhar. Boxers from KUK won 3 Gold and 3 Bronze Medals under their boxing coach Rajesh Kumar Rajound. The university has been awarded Maulana Abul Kalam Azad (MAKA) Trophy, representing the highest award given for inter-university sports and university sportsperson performance in international and national arena by the Government of India, in the year 1966–1967.

See also

 List of institutions of higher education in Haryana
 State University of Performing And Visual Arts
 State Institute of Film and Television

References

External links
 

 
Educational institutions established in 1956
1956 establishments in East Punjab
Recipients of the Maulana Abul Kalam Azad Trophy